Cobalt oxide is a family of chemical compounds consisting of cobalt and oxygen atoms.

Compounds in the cobalt oxide family include:

Cobalt(II) oxide (cobaltous oxide), CoO
Cobalt(III) oxide (cobaltic oxide), Co2O3
Cobalt(II,III) oxide, Co3O4

See also
Cobalt oxide nanoparticle